Le beau Monde (Fashionable Society), opus 199, is a quadrille composed by Johann Strauss II, written in 1857, while Strauss was conducting a tour of Russia with his orchestra. The work exudes the authentic musical flavour of Russia, and the St. Petersburg edition of the work describes the composition as a Quadrille sur des airs Russes (Quadrilles on Russian Airs). The title of the quadrille reflects the fashion then in Russia for the French language.

References

Compositions by Johann Strauss II
1857 compositions